New Mill or Newmill may refer to:

United Kingdom

Places 
 New Mill, Cornwall
 New Mill, former name of Miskin, Rhondda Cynon Taf
 New Mill, an area of Tring, Hertfordshire, England
 Newmill, a village near Keith, Moray
 Newmill-on-Teviot, a location near Hawick, Scottish Borders
 New Mill, West Yorkshire
 New Mill, a hamlet near Milton Lilbourne, Wiltshire
 New Mill End, Bedfordshire
 Luton Hoo railway station, previously called New Mill End railway station

Windmills

New Mill, Attleborough, a windmill in Norfolk
New Mill, Badingham, a windmill in Suffolk
New Mill, Beckley, a windmill in East Sussex
New Mill, Chiddingly, a windmill in East Sussex
New Mill, Coseley, a windmill in Staffordshire
New Mill, Cross in Hand, a windmill in East Sussex
New Mill, East Ruston, a windmill in Norfolk
New Mill, Gorefield, a windmill in Cambridgeshire
New Mill, Great Coggeshall, a windmill in Essex
New Mill, Henfield, a windmill in West Sussex
New Mill, Hornchurch, a windmill in Essex
New Mill, Keyingham a windmill in the East Riding of Yorkshire
New Mill, Leven a windmill in the East Riding of Yorkshire
New Mill, Lydd, a windmill in Kent
New Mill, Northbourne, a windmill in Kent
New Mill, North Kelsey, a windmill in Lincolnshire
New Mill, North Walsham, a windmill in Norfolk
New Mill, Plumstead, a windmill in Norfolk
New Mill, Preston next Wingham, a windmill in Kent
New Mill, Prittlewell, a windmill in Essex
New Mill, Rottingdean, a windmill in East Sussex
New Mill, Rye, a windmill in East Sussex
New Mill, Seaton Ross,  a windmill in the East Riding of Yorkshire
New Mill, Stebbing, a windmill in Essex
New Mill, Swingfield, a windmill in Kent
New Mill, Tadworth, a windmill in Surrey
New Mill, Tring, a Hertfordshire
New Mill, Willesborough, a windmill in Kent
New Mill, Worlingworth, a windmill in Suffolk
Highdown New Mill, Angmering, a windmill in West Sussex
Glover's New Mill, Blean, a windmill in Kent
New Mill Piece Mill, Brandon, a windmill in Suffolk
Lashmar's New Mill, Brighton, a windmill in East Sussex
Ruiton New Mill, Sedgeley, a windmill in Staffordshire
Tivoli New Mill, St Leonard's, a windmill in East Sussex

Watermills
New Mill, Crowborough, a watermill on the Warren Brook, East Sussex
New Mill, Hollingbourne, a watermill on the River Len, Kent
New Mill, Sissinghurst, a watermill on a tributary of the Hammer Stream, Kent

Cotton Mills
New Mill, Ancoats, Lancashire
New Mill, Eccleston, Lancashire
New Mill, part of the Murrays' Mills complex in Manchester, Lancashire
New Mill, Reddish North, near Stockport, Cheshire
Pear New Mill, in Stockport, Cheshire

Other
Newmill (horse), a Thoroughbred racehorse
New Mill Offset railway station, later renamed Newmill, then Carmont

United States
New Mill and Depot Building, Hawthorne Woolen Mill, Greenwich, CT, listed on the NRHP in Connecticut
New Bremen Mill, Tinley Park, a windmill in Illinois

See also
New Mills (disambiguation)